Dimorphotheca is a genus of plants in the family Asteraceae, native to Africa. is one of eight genera of the Calenduleae, with a centre of diversity in Southern Africa.  Some species can hybridize with Osteospermum, and crosses are sold as cultivated ornamentals.  The name "Dimorphotheca" comes from the Greek "Dis" "Morphe" and "Theka", meaning "two shaped receptacle", referring to the dimorphic cypselae, a trait inherent to members of the Calenduleae. Plants of this genus usually have bisexual flowers.

 Species

References 

 
Asteraceae genera